To Love and Die is the title of an American television action comedy-drama starring Shiri Appleby and Tim Matheson, and created by Sara Goodman. The show was greenlit to series on the USA Network in July 2007, with a 12-episode order that was planned to air in 2008. The 2-hour pilot finally premiered on December 30, 2008, as a television movie, receiving little promotion. The series was believed to have been dropped by the channel.

The pilot was directed by Mark Piznarski.

Characters

Main characters
Hildy Young (Shiri Appleby) — Young woman with intimacy issues who, after finding her father, ends up working for him as a contract killer.
 James White (Tim Matheson) — Hildy's contract killer father.
 Janet (Frances Fisher) — Hildy's intrusive and overbearing mother who constantly inserts herself into her daughter's messy love life.
 Nancy (Kristin Datillo) — Hildy's well mannered sister that has played it safe in life, opting for a quiet suburban home, two kids and a nice, boring husband.
 Eddie (Christine Adams) — A key member of White's contracting organization
 Blue (Ivan Sergei) — James's protégé who meets his match when he meets his boss's daughter
 Grandfather (Seymour Cassel) — James's former mentor, who handed the reins to James but often complains about his way of doing things and remembers how it used to be in the old days.

Main crew
To Love and Die is produced by NBC Universal Television Studios and Broadway Video. Lorne Michaels ("Saturday Night Live," "30 Rock"), Andrew Singer ("Sons & Daughters"), Sara Goodman , and David Kanter ("Crime & Punishment") serve as executive producers.

References

External links
 
 To Love and Die on USA Network

USA Network original films
2008 American television series debuts
2008 American television series endings
American action comedy television series
2000s comedy-drama television series